Ketu South Municipal Assembly formerly Ketu South District, is one of the eighteen districts in Volta Region, Ghana. Originally it was formerly part of the then-larger Ketu District on 10 March 1989, which was created from the former Anlo District Council, until the northern part of the district was split off to create Ketu North District on 29 February 2008; thus the remaining part has been renamed as Ketu South District. It was later elevated to municipal district assembly status on 28 June 2012 to become Ketu South Municipal District. The municipality is located in the southeast part of Volta Region and has Denu as its capital town. The Municipality is known be the largest Kente Production Hub in Ghana.

Geography 

The district is bonded by Togo to the east, the Gulf of Guinea to the south, Keta Municipal District to the west and Ketu North District to the north.

Settlements 
The largest settlements in the district are Aflao, Avoeme, Klikor, Pernyi, and Agbozume. Other settlements include Salakope, Adina, Denu, Sonuto, Blekusu, Adafienu, Nogokpoe, Agavedzi and Amutsinu.

Elections 
In the 2016 general elections, this constituency has been listed as the topmost one by voter population with over 141,698 registered voters.

References 

Districts of Volta Region

States and territories disestablished in 2008